The 2016–17 Lehigh Mountain Hawks women's basketball team represented Lehigh University during the 2016–17 NCAA Division I women's basketball season. The Mountain Hawks, led by twenty-second year head coach Sue Troyan, played their home games at Stabler Arena and were members of the Patriot League. They finished the season 10–20, 5–13 in Patriot League play to finish in ninth place. They lost in the first round of the Patriot League women's tournament where they lost to Loyola (MD).

Roster

Schedule

|-
!colspan=9 style="background:#502D0E; color:#FFFFFF;"| Non-conference regular season

|-
!colspan=9 style="background:#502D0E; color:#FFFFFF;"| Patriot League regular season

|-
!colspan=9 style="background:#502D0E; color:#FFFFFF;"| Patriot League Women's Tournament

See also
 2016–17 Lehigh Mountain Hawks men's basketball team

References

Lehigh
Lehigh Mountain Hawks women's basketball seasons
Lehigh
Lehigh